Maley & Taunton is a defunct tram and tramway engineering company. It was situated in Wednesfield in Staffordshire, England. The principals, Alfred Walter Maley and Edmund MacKenzie Taunton (b 1884) held patents for tram and tramway machinery and equipment. The company exported globally, with its tram trucks used, among others, in Lisbon, Johannesburg, and Hong Kong, and locally — to the Blackpool tramway, Sheffield Corporation, Liverpool Corporation, Glasgow Corporation, and the Manx Electric Railway.

See also
 List of tram builders

Notes

Tram transport in England
Defunct manufacturing companies of the United Kingdom
Engineering companies of the United Kingdom
Manufacturing companies based in Wolverhampton